List of Olympic venues in rugby may refer to:

List of Olympic venues in rugby sevens, disputed first time in 2016
List of Olympic venues in rugby union, disputed in 1900, 1908, 1920 and 1924